Luke Edward Walton (born May 29, 1979) is an American rower. He competed at the 2004 Summer Olympics in Athens, where he placed 11th in the men's coxless pair, along with Artour Samsonov. Walton was born in Poway, California.

Walton represented Cambridge at the 2005 Boat Race. Oxford would go on to win this edition of the event.

References

1979 births
Living people
American male rowers
Olympic rowers of the United States
Rowers at the 2004 Summer Olympics
Alumni of St Edmund's College, Cambridge